HMS Foxglove was an  minesweeping sloop of the Royal Navy. She saw service in World War I and World War II.

Construction
Foxglove was built at Glasgow, Scotland, by Barclay Curle and launched on 30 March 1915. She entered service later that year.

World War I
Foxglove was delivered to the Royal Navy on 14 May 1915, the first of her class to enter service, Foxglove was deployed to Scapa Flow, and on 5 June 1915, was ordered with sister ship  to search for the German submarine  which had sunk two British steamers, ten fishing vessels and a Danish sailing vessel east of Fair Isle and the Orkney Islands between 2 and 4 June. The two sloops did not find U-19, which was well to the south of their search line, but did rescue the survivors of one the trawlers sunk by the submarine. During World War I, Foxglove and the other Acacia-class sloops were used almost exclusively for minesweeping duties until 1917, when the Royal Navy began to use them as convoy escorts, a task to which they were well suited.

Interwar
Foxglove served on the China Station during the early 1920s.

On the evening of 3 March 1921, the Singaporean passenger ship  grounded on the White Rocks off Lamock Island, Swatow, China, and was wrecked with the loss of an estimated 900 to 1,000 lives. The steamer  discovered the wreck on the morning of 4 March and rendered assistance, rescuing 45 survivors before steaming to Swatow to seek additional help for Hong Moh. Upon receiving word of the disaster, the British consul at Swatow informed the British Senior Naval Officer at Hong Kong, who in turn broadcast a wireless message requesting ships to come to Hong Moh′s aid. Foxglove arrived on the scene late on 5 March but was unable to locate the wreck in the darkness. The Royal Navy light cruiser  joined Foxglove on the scene at dawn on 6 March, and the two ships located Hong Moh and began to rescue additional survivors, with Foxglove taking 28 or 48 (sources differ) survivors on board before having to depart late in the afternoon to refuel. Carlisle remained on the scene until 8 March, leaving only when there was no further sign of life board the wreck of Hong Moh; she then proceeded to Hong Kong with 221 survivors aboard.

World War II
Foxglove was one of only two Acacia-class sloops to survive long enough to see service in World War II. She became a loss when she was dive-bombed and badly damaged by German aircraft off the Isle of Wight on 9 July 1940. She remained afloat, and was converted into an accommodation ship and base ship. In this new role, she became a harbour guard ship in 1941, serving at Londonderry (also known as Derry) in Northern Ireland for the remainder of World War II.

Fate
The last surviving Acacia-class sloop, Foxglove was sold for scrapping on 7 September 1946. She was scrapped at Troon, Scotland.

Legacy
Foxgloves logbook is among those that was selected for digitisation as part of the online Old Weather project.

Notes

References
Colledge, J. J. Ships of the Royal Navy: The Complete Record of All Fighting Ships of the Royal Navy From the Fifteenth Century To the Present. Annapolis, Maryland: Naval Institute Press, 1987. .
 
Gray, Randal, ed. Conway's All The World's Fighting Ships 1906-1921. Annapolis, Maryland: Naval Institute Press, 1985. .
 
BBC Radio Foyle People's War.
Clydebuilt Database Shipping Times.
Maritime Connector: Passenger Ship Incidents.

 

Acacia-class sloops
Ships built on the River Clyde
1915 ships
Maritime incidents in July 1940